Claire Messent (born 25 July 1985) is a former Australian field hockey player.

Career
Messent was born in Melbourne, Victoria, and made her senior international debut in a test match against Argentina in August 2006.

References

1985 births
Living people
Australian female field hockey players
Female field hockey forwards
21st-century Australian women